Sunil Joshi (born 14 November 1977) is an Indian former cricketer. He played one first-class match and two List A matches for Delhi in 1999/00.

See also
 List of Delhi cricketers

References

External links
 

1977 births
Living people
Indian cricketers
Delhi cricketers
Cricketers from Delhi